Cherecheș and Chiricheș are Romanian surnames, derived from the Hungarian Kerekes. Notable people with the surname include:

Cătălin Cherecheș, Romanian politician 
Gabriel Cherecheș, Romanian diver
Vlad Chiricheș, Romanian footballer

Romanian-language surnames